Carposina megalosema is a moth in the Carposinidae family. It was described by Alexey Diakonoff in 1949. It is found on Java.

References

Natural History Museum Lepidoptera generic names catalog

Carposinidae
Moths described in 1949
Moths of Indonesia